Martinus Putuhena (27 May 1901 – 20 September 1982) was an Indonesian engineer and politician. He was the Minister of Public Works under Sutan Sjahrir during the Indonesian National Revolution, and briefly served as the Prime Minister for the State of East Indonesia prior to its dissolution.

Originating from Saparua, Putuhena was educated at the Technische Hoge School in Bandung before working as an engineer for the colonial government. After his governmental career as public works minister during the Indonesian National Revolution, Putuhena was appointed to the State of East Indonesia initially as a compromise candidate for a security takeover, before the political situation resulted in a complete takeover which he supervised. He continued to work under the government until 1958, before entering the private sector as a consultant.

Early life and education
Putuhena was born on 27 May 1901 in the village of Ihamahu, on the island of Saparua in modern Maluku. He was the third of five children. His family was a relatively affluent fishing family, and his father Petrus Putuhena also cultivated cloves in addition to operating a fishing boat. As a child, he began studying at a local village school, before learning Dutch and enrolling at the main school of Saparua. After completing his studies there, he moved to Tondano to continue his education under a scholarship, and then at an Algemene Middelbare School (AMS) in Yogyakarta. He graduated from the AMS in 1923.

After AMS, Putuhena decided to continue to the Technische Hoge School (THS) in Bandung, instead of the medical school STOVIA. He had initially wanted to continue his studies at the Netherlands, but the Ambonsch Studiefonds, his sponsor organization that also funded the studies of other future Ambonese leaders, lacked needed funds. At THS, he studied "wet" civil engineering. During this period, Putuhena became friends with Sukarno who was one year his senior at THS, and he joined Sukarno's . He graduated as an engineer in 1927.

Career
After graduating, Putuhena began to work at the Public Works Department of the colonial government, supervising the construction of the Bandung Post Office as his first assignment. He was reassigned several times - to Batavia, Cirebon and Purwakarta before being posted in Lombok on the eve of the Second World War. At Lombok, he was appointed head of the local public works office, and supervised the construction of the Port of Ampenan. Following the Japanese invasion of the Dutch East Indies, Putuhena was tasked with sabotaging the infrastructure on Lombok, but due to reluctance from the locals the extent of the damage was limited. He initially retained his job during the Japanese occupation, but after he began to skip work in protest of Japanese brutality, he was investigated and was then incarcerated in Bali for seven months. After his release, he was reassigned to Jakarta.

After the proclamation of Indonesian independence, Putuhena was appointed as minister of public works in the cabinets of Sutan Sjahrir. A member of the Indonesian Christian Party, he also became a member of the Central Indonesian National Committee representing Maluku, and along with other Moluccan leaders Putuhena cofounded the Partai Politik Maloekoe in May 1946 to preserve the envisioned unitary nature of the Indonesian state in the aftermath of the Linggadjati Agreement. After the Sjahrir cabinet collapsed, Putuhena was retained as a civil servant while also lecturing at Gadjah Mada University.

By late 1949, with the revolution coming to a close, a question arose regarding security forces in the State of East Indonesia (NIT). While the central government in Yogyakarta intended to take over, the NIT government refused the appointment of an Indonesian National Armed Forces officer as head of the takeover commission and wanted a KNIL one instead. Putuhena was appointed as a compromise, as while he was firmly in the Republican camp, his Moluccan origin made him an acceptable candidate for the NIT politicians. He established the commission in Makassar in January 1950, and while his work calmed down tensions between the TNI and the KNIL, the APRA coup in January 1950 altered the political situation as the central government began to crack down on the regional governments. The Makassar uprising led by Andi Aziz followed in April, which after its suppression resulted in increased calls for NIT's dissolution. Putuhena was eventually appointed as Prime Minister of East Indonesia on 8 May 1950, his cabinet being known as the "Liquidation Cabinet" as he was tasked with preparing for the dissolution of the state and its incorporation into unitary Indonesia. He formally dissolved the NIT government in Makassar on 16 August 1950, and returned to Jakarta. Aside from this, Putuhena had also taken part with negotiations with the breakaway Republic of South Maluku.

Following his return, he was appointed as Secretary-General of the ministry of public works, a position in which he remained until 1956. In this capacity, Putuhena established an academy of public works and arranged for Indonesian engineers to be trained abroad. After his retirement, he rejected an offer to be Ambassador to Burma and was placed in the board of Billiton Indonesia, negotiating the company's takeover by the Indonesian government to form PT Timah.

Later life

After his retirement from Billiton, Putuhena began working in the private sector, starting a consulting firm to advise on the construction of an Indonesian Atomic Energy Agency facility. The project was halted in 1965 due to the 30 September movement, causing Putuhena's firm to go bankrupt and forcing him to sell his house to move to a smaller one in Tebet, then within the city outskirts. His finances recovered in the 1970s as he formed another consulting firm and began winning projects from the government. He received the Star of Mahaputera, 3rd Class from president Suharto on 13 August 1976. He had by then moved to another small house in Pasar Minggu, which was demolished by a road expansion in 1976.

Putuhena died on 20 September 1982, at the Gatot Soebroto Army Hospital in Jakarta. He had been suffering from complications of hypertension and diabetes for several years. By then, he had fallen into obscurity, with his former colleagues and family only finding out about his condition from a newspaper article in late August 1982. He was buried at the Kalibata Heroes' Cemetery. He had seven children with Leen Wattimena.

References

Bibliography
 
 
 

1901 births
1982 deaths
People from Saparua
Public works ministers of Indonesia
Indonesian Christians
Indonesian civil servants
20th-century Indonesian engineers
Politicians from the State of East Indonesia
Bandung Institute of Technology alumni
Academic staff of Gadjah Mada University
Indonesian civil engineers